Apache Samza is an open-source, near-realtime, asynchronous computational framework for stream processing developed by the Apache Software Foundation in Scala and Java. It has been developed in conjunction with Apache Kafka. Both were originally developed by LinkedIn.

Overview
Samza allows users to build stateful applications that process data in real-time from multiple sources including Apache Kafka. 

Samza provides fault tolerance, isolation and stateful processing. Unlike batch systems such as Apache Hadoop or Apache Spark, it provides continuous computation and output, which result in sub-second response times.

There are many players in the field of real-time stream processing and Samza is one of the mature products. It was added to Apache in 2013.

Samza is used by multiple companies. The biggest installation is in LinkedIn.

See also

 Apache Beam
 Druid (open-source data store)
 List of Apache Software Foundation projects
 Storm (event processor)

References

External links
 Apache Samza website

LinkedIn software
Samza
Java platform
Free software programmed in Java (programming language)
Free software programmed in Scala
Software using the Apache license
Free software
Distributed stream processing
Distributed computing architecture
Parallel computing